Mark Howell is a Canadian ice hockey coach and former player working as the head coach of the University of Calgary's Calgary Dinos. Howell was named the CIS Coach of the Year for the 2010–11 season.

References

External links

Mark Howell's bio at Calgary Dinos

Seattle Thunderbirds players
Medicine Hat Tigers players
Asheville Smoke players
Living people
Year of birth missing (living people)